Einer Augusto Rubio Reyes (born 22 February 1998 in Chíquiza) is a Colombian cyclist, who currently rides for UCI WorldTeam . In October 2020, he was named in the startlist for the 2020 Giro d'Italia.

Major results

2017
 10th Giro del Medio Brenta
2018
 1st GP Capodarco
 1st Stage 5 Giro Ciclistico d'Italia
 4th Overall Giro del Friuli-Venezia Giulia
1st  Mountains classification
1st Stage 2
 4th Overall Giro della Valle d'Aosta
 8th Giro del Medio Brenta
2019
 2nd Overall Giro Ciclistico d'Italia
1st  Mountains classification
1st Stage 9
 4th Giro del Medio Brenta 
 4th Trofeo Città di San Vendemiano
 6th Piccolo Giro di Lombardia
 6th Giro del Belvedere
2021 
 5th Overall Vuelta Asturias
 7th Overall Vuelta a Burgos
1st  Young rider classification
2022
 4th Giro della Toscana
 5th Overall Tour de Langkawi
 10th Overall Tour de Romandie
2023
 1st Stage 3 UAE Tour
 4th Overall Vuelta a San Juan

Grand Tour general classification results timeline

References

External links

1998 births
Living people
Colombian male cyclists
Sportspeople from Boyacá Department
21st-century Colombian people